The Best FIFA Football Awards 2020 were held on 17 December 2020. The ceremony was held virtually due to the ongoing COVID-19 pandemic.

Winners and nominees

The Best FIFA Men's Player

Eleven players were shortlisted on 25 November 2020. The three finalists were revealed on 11 December 2020.

Robert Lewandowski won the award with 52 rank points.

The selection criteria for the men's players of the year was: respective achievements during the period from 20 July 2019 to 7 October 2020.

The Best FIFA Men's Goalkeeper

Six players were shortlisted on 25 November 2020. The three finalists were revealed on 11 December 2020.

Manuel Neuer won the award with 28 rank points.

The Best FIFA Men's Coach

Five coaches were initially shortlisted on 25 November 2020. The three finalists were revealed on 11 December 2020.

Jürgen Klopp won the award with 24 rank points.

The Best FIFA Women's Player

Eleven players were shortlisted on 25 November 2020. The three finalists were revealed on 11 December 2020.

Lucy Bronze won the award with 52 rank points.

The selection criteria for the women's players of the year was: respective achievements during the period from 8 July 2019 to 7 October 2020.

The Best FIFA Women's Goalkeeper

Six players were shortlisted on 25 November 2020. The three finalists were revealed on 11 December 2020.

Sarah Bouhaddi won the award with 24 rank points.

The Best FIFA Women's Coach

Seven coaches were initially shortlisted on 25 November 2020. The three finalists were revealed on 11 December 2020.

Sarina Wiegman won the award with 26 rank points.

FIFA Puskás Award
 
The eleven players shortlisted for the awards were announced on 25 November 2020. The three finalists were revealed on 11 December 2020. All goals up for consideration were scored from 20 July 2019 to 7 October 2020. Every registered FIFA.com user was allowed to participate in the final vote until 9 December 2020, with the questionnaire being presented on the official website of FIFA. The top three goals from the vote were then voted on by a panel of ten "FIFA experts", who chose the winner.

Son Heung-min won the award with 24 rank points.

FIFA Fan Award

The award celebrates the best fan moments or gestures of September 2019 to September 2020, regardless of championship, gender or nationality. The shortlist was compiled by a panel of FIFA experts, and every registered FIFA.com user was allowed to participate in the final vote until 16 December 2020.

The three nominees were announced on 25 November 2020. Marivaldo Francisco da Silva won the award with over 130,000 votes.

FIFA Fair Play Award

FIFA FIFPRO Men's World 11

The 55–player men's shortlist was announced on 10 December 2020.

The players chosen were Alisson as goalkeeper, Trent Alexander-Arnold, Alphonso Davies, Sergio Ramos and Virgil van Dijk as defenders, Kevin De Bruyne, Joshua Kimmich and Thiago as midfielders, and Robert Lewandowski, Lionel Messi and Cristiano Ronaldo as forwards.

 Ranking of other nominees

FIFA FIFPRO Women's World 11

The 55–player women's shortlist was announced on 10 December 2020.

The players chosen were Christiane Endler as goalkeeper, Millie Bright, Lucy Bronze and Wendie Renard as defenders, Barbara Bonansea, Verónica Boquete and Delphine Cascarino as midfielders, and Pernille Harder, Tobin Heath, Vivianne Miedema and Megan Rapinoe as forwards.

 Ranking of other nominees

Selection panels

Men's selection panel
The panel of experts who shortlisted the nominees for The Best FIFA Football Awards 2020 for the men's players and coaches comprised:

  Cafu
  Essam El Hadary
  Diego Forlán
  Faryd Mondragón
  Park Ji-sung
  Bastian Schweinsteiger
  Hristo Stoichkov
  David Suazo
  Yaya Touré
  David Villa

Women's selection panel
The panel of experts who shortlisted the nominees for The Best FIFA Football Awards 2020 for the women's players and coaches comprised:

  Rachel Brown
  Han Duan
  Jill Ellis
  Julie Fleeting
  Rosana Gómez
  Amber Hearn
  Steffi Jones
  Lotta Schelin
  Jacqui Shipanga
  Melissa Tancredi

References

External links
 Official website

2020
2020 in association football
2020 sports awards
Women's association football trophies and awards
2020 in women's association football